Diphasiastrum complanatum, common names groundcedar, creeping jenny, or northern running-pine, is a species of clubmoss native to dry coniferous forests in colder northerly parts of the world.  Under the original name Lycopodium complanatum, this was an inclusive superspecies that included a number of other species now known to be biologically separate.

Distribution
As the species is currently recognized, it has been found in Canada, Greenland, northern and central Europe including montane regions of the British Isles, Russia, China, Japan, India, Thailand, and the northern United States.

Description
Diphasiastrum complanatum is a perennial herb spreading by means of stolons that run along the surface of the ground. Above-ground stems tend to branch within the same geometric plane (hence the specific epithet "complanatum," meaning "same plane"). Strobili are vertical borne in groups of up to 4 at the ends of some of the branches.

References

complanatum
Flora of North America
Plants described in 1753
Taxa named by Carl Linnaeus
Flora of Europe
Flora of Asia